The Buckskin Man Tales is a series of five Western novels by American author Frederick Manfred which traces themes through the 19th-century Great Plains. Each novel is set in a different time and place on the American frontier, with most of them telling fictionalized stories about real historical people and events. In order of publication, the books are:
 Lord Grizzly (1954), set around 1820–1825
 Riders of Judgment (1957), set in 1892
 Conquering Horse (1959), set before 1800
 Scarlet Plume (1964), set in 1862–1863
 King of Spades (1965), set in 1860–1876

Novel series
Western United States in fiction